The S. H. Kress and Co. Building at 140 South Beach Street in Daytona Beach, Florida, United States is celebrating its 90 year in continuous operation now as home to 40 professional office suite businesses in the historic building. In 1932 it was designed as one of America's 225 architectural "Main Street" treasures of the S. H. Kress & Co. "five and dime" department store chain. On July 7, 1983, it was added to the U.S. National Register of Historic Places.

The building is owned by Mac Smith, a Daytona Beach businessman who has owned it for over 30 years. It was subdivided into  of office space in the early 1980s. Among the major professional office suites is the Celebration Title Group,  the Balliker Art Gallery, DC Construction Company, Jane Devine, LMFT, Primerica, Prime Lending, Shorstein & Kelly Law, Heidi Webb Law, Work Webb, William Weeks Architecture . Volusia Land Management Group, The office building is a family partnership business operated by the Smith family and dedicated to reinvigorating the downtown business community.

References

External links
 Volusia County listings at National Register of Historic Places
 Florida's Office of Cultural and Historical Programs
 Volusia County listings at Florida's Office of Cultural and Historical Programs
 S.H. Kress and Co. Building
 "Landmark office building sold" Daytona Beach News-Journal

National Register of Historic Places in Volusia County, Florida
Art Deco architecture in Florida
S. H. Kress & Co.
Buildings and structures in Daytona Beach, Florida